Gavin Lackey (born 27 July 1968) is an Australian modern pentathlete. He competed at the 1992 Summer Olympics.

References

External links
 

1968 births
Living people
Australian male modern pentathletes
Olympic modern pentathletes of Australia
Modern pentathletes at the 1992 Summer Olympics